Malokilikili Island is an inhabited island in Sanma Province of Vanuatu in the Pacific Ocean. Malokilikili lies off the eastern coast of Malo Island.

Population
As of 2015, the official local population is 12 people in two households.

References

Islands of Vanuatu
Sanma Province